The men's 200m freestyle events at the 2020 World Para Swimming European Championships were held at the Penteada Olympic Pools Complex.

Medalists

Results

S2

S3

S4

S5

S14
Heats

Final

References

2020 World Para Swimming European Championships